Mosque of Qanibay al-Muhammadi is one of the historical mosques in Cairo, Egypt, built in 1413 CE during the Burji dynasty era of Mamluk Sultanate. It is located at Al-Saleeba street in Islamic Cairo, and there is Mosque and Khanqah of Shaykhu at its neighbor.

Patron
Prince Qanibay al-Muhammadi was bought by Sultan Al-Zaher Barqouq from a merchant named Muhammad, hence he obtained the nisbah of "al-Muhammadi". Qanibay served the Sultan Barqouq and then the service of Shaykh al-Mahmudi, deputy of Damascus, and was appointed as a great Dawudara during the Sultanate of Prince Faraj bin Barqouq. Dawudara is the title for one of the most important officials of the construction bureau, which was in charge of the correspondence of the official authorities and preparing the letters sent by the Sultan to various kings and princes. Then he was appointed as a deputy of Damascus during the reign of Sultan Shaykh al-Mahmudi, but was killed among other princes who rebelled against the Sultan. He was later buried in Damascus.

See also
 Lists of mosques
 List of mosques in Africa
 List of mosques in Egypt

References

External links

 Government Website of Islamic artifacts

15th-century mosques
Mosques in Cairo
Buildings and structures completed in 1413
Mosque buildings with domes
Mamluk architecture in Egypt
15th-century establishments in the Mamluk Sultanate